Tauron Arena Kraków is an indoor arena located in Kraków, Poland. It has a seating capacity of 15,030 for sporting events. It hosted the 2014 FIVB Volleyball Men's World Championship tournament, 2016 European League of Legends Championship Finals and 2015 IIHF Ice Hockey World Championship Division I.

Overview

Tauron Arena Kraków is the largest and one of the most modern entertainment and sports venues in Poland. It allows to host a variety of sports events, including badminton, boxing, curling, acrobatic and artistic gymnastics, indoor football, hockey, basketball, track and field, figure skating, volleyball, handball, martial arts, extreme sports, tennis, table tennis, equestrian competitions, and sports dancing competitions. The arena meets the requirements for the organization of world championship events 

The facility is also adapted to the organization of trade fairs, concerts, performances, congresses, conferences and business events. Events also take place in the area around the venue and in the smaller adjoined arena, which serves both as a training hall and a place for organizing smaller events  

The facility area has 61,434 m2, with maximum area of the arena court of 4 546 m2. The average capacity is 18,000 for concerts, and 15,000 for sport events, with maximum number of spectators being 22,000. The Arena boasts Poland's largest LED media façade, with a total surface of 5,200 m2 of LED strip lighting, wrapping around the stadium, and one of Europe's largest LED screens, measuring over 540 m2.

Events

Sports events

 2014 FIVB Volleyball Men's World Championship
 UFC Fight Night: Gonzaga vs. Cro Cop 2
 2015 IIHF Ice Hockey World Championship Division I
 2016 European Men's Handball Championship
 2016 Summer European League of Legends Championship Series finals
 2017 Men's European Volleyball Championship
 2017 PGL CS:GO Major Championship

Concerts

See also
List of indoor arenas in Poland
List of European ice hockey arenas
Sport in Poland

References

External links

 

Buildings and structures in Kraków
Handball venues in Poland
Indoor arenas in Poland
Indoor ice hockey venues in Poland
Sport in Kraków
Sports venues completed in 2014
Sports venues in Lesser Poland Voivodeship
Volleyball venues in Poland
2014 establishments in Poland
Boxing venues in Poland
Mixed martial arts venues in Poland